This is a list of properties and districts in Jeff Davis County, Georgia that are listed on the National Register of Historic Places (NRHP).

Current listings

|}

References

Jeff Davis
Buildings and structures in Jeff Davis County, Georgia